The Duchy of Czersk was a feudal district duchy in Masovia, centered on the Czersk Land. Its capital was Czersk.

The country was established in 1275, in the partition of the Duchy of Masovia, with duke Konrad II becoming its ruler. After his death,the duchy was unified with the Duchy of Płock, forming the Duchy of Masovia, on 24 June 1294. The state was again reestablished in 1310, with Trojden I, as its first ruler. It existed until 5 November 1370, when, under the rule of duke Siemowit III, duchies of Czersk, Rawa, and Warsaw were unified into the Duchy of Masovia. It was once again reestablished in 1471, from the part of the territories of the duchies of Płock and Warsaw. In 1488, it incorporated the Duchy of Warsaw, into its territory. It existed until 1495, when, with the incorporation of the Duchy of Płock into the Kingdom of Poland, it remained the only state in Masovia, and subsequently, got reformed into the Duchy of Masovia.

Between 1275 and 1294, it was an independent state, while from 1310 to 1320, it was a fiefdom within the Kingdom of Poland, and from 1320 to 1370 a fiefdom of the United Kingdom of Poland, and from 1471 to 1495, a fiefdom of the Crown of the Kingdom of Poland.

List of rulers

First state 
 Konrad II of Masovia (1275–1294)

Second state 
 Trojden I (1310–1341)
 Siemowit III and Casimir I of Warsaw (1341–1349)
 Casimir I of Warsaw (1349–1355)
 Siemowit III (1355–1370)

Third state 
 Konrad III Rudy (1471–1495)

Citations

Notes

References

Bibliography 
Agnieszka Teterycz-Puzio, Piastowskie księżne regentki O utrzymanie władzy dla synów (koniec XII w. - początek XIV w.).
Agnieszka Teterycz-Puzio, Bolesław II Mazowiecki.
Janusz Grabowski, Dynastia Piastów Mazowieckich.
Anna Suprunik, Mazowsze Siemowitó.
Adam Bujak, Nekropolie królów i książąt polskich. Warsaw. Wydawnictwo Sport i Turystyka. 1988. ISBN 83-217-2720-4.

Former countries in Europe
Former monarchies of Europe
Duchies of Poland
Fiefdoms of Poland
History of Poland during the Piast dynasty
History of Masovia
13th-century establishments in Poland
13th-century disestablishments in Poland
14th-century establishments in Poland
14th-century disestablishments in Poland
15th-century establishments in Poland
15th-century disestablishments in Poland
States and territories established in 1275
States and territories disestablished in 1294
States and territories established in 1310
States and territories disestablished in 1370
States and territories established in 1471
States and territories disestablished in 1495
Former duchies